{{DISPLAYTITLE:C8H7ClO2}}
The molecular formula C8H7ClO2 (molar mass: 170.59 g/mol, exact mass: 170.0135 u) may refer to:

 Anisoyl chloride
 Benzyl chloroformate, or benzyl chlorocarbonate

Molecular formulas